Judge Jacobs may refer to:

Dennis Jacobs (born 1944), judge of the United States Court of Appeals for the Second Circuit
Fred Clinton Jacobs (1865–1958), judge of the United States District Court for the District of Arizona
Julian Jacobs (born 1937), judge of the United States Tax Court

See also
Justice Jacobs (disambiguation)